Walkervale is a suburb of Bundaberg in the Bundaberg Region, Queensland, Australia.

Geography 
The North Coast railway line runs along the western boundary of the suburb; there is no railway station in the suburb.

History 
In 1946 land was purchased  at 139 Barolin Street to build a Catholic Church and School. St Mary's Catholic Church was blessed and opened  on 9 December 1951 by Bishop Andrew Tynan. On Tuesday 11 February 2020 the church was destroyed by a fire, believed to be arson.

Education 
Walkervale State School is a government primary (Early Childhood-6) school for boys and girls at 46a Hurst Street. In 2017, the school had an enrolment of 437 students with 37 teachers (32 full-time equivalent) and 24 non-teaching staff (15 full-time equivalent). It includes a special education program.

There are no secondary schools in Walkervale; the nearest secondary schools are in neighbouring Bundaberg South and Kepnock.

References

External link 

 View of St Mary's Catholic Church before the fire of February 2020

Bundaberg Region
Suburbs of Bundaberg